Joseph George Lucchesi (loo-kay-see; born June 6, 1993) is an American professional baseball pitcher for the New York Mets of Major League Baseball (MLB). He made his MLB debut with the San Diego Padres in 2018.

Career

San Diego Padres
Lucchesi attended Newark Memorial High School in Newark, California, and played college baseball at Chabot College and Southeast Missouri State University. He was named the Ohio Valley Conference Pitcher of the Year in 2015 and 2016. In 2016, his junior season, he went 10–5 with a 2.19 ERA in 17 games (16 starts). He was drafted by the San Diego Padres in the fourth round of the 2016 Major League Baseball draft.

Lucchesi signed and made his professional debut with the Tri-City Dust Devils. On July 28, he combined with three other pitchers, to throw a one-hitter versus the Spokane Indians. He was promoted to the Fort Wayne TinCaps in September. In 15 total games between the two teams, he posted an 0–2 record and 1.29 ERA with 56 strikeouts in 42 innings. In 2017, Lucchesi played for both the Lake Elsinore Storm and the San Antonio Missions, pitching to a combined 11–7 record with a 2.20 ERA and 0.97 WHIP in 24 total games (23 starts) between both clubs.

Lucchesi made his major league debut on March 30, 2018, at Petco Park against the Milwaukee Brewers, making him the first pitcher from the 2016 draft to reach the major leagues and second player overall after Austin Hays. He started the game and pitched 4 innings, giving up three earned runs on seven hits along with striking out one; he did not receive a decision as the Brewers defeated the Padres 8–6. Lucchesi missed a month on the disabled list with a right hip strain in late May and early June, but was otherwise a regular member of the Padres' rotation.  He finished his 2018 rookie campaign pitching to an 8–9 record with a 4.08 ERA in 26 starts.  He led the rotation with ten strikeouts per nine innings, but only averaged 5.0 innings per start.

In 2019, Lucchesi led the pitching staff in wins (10), innings, strikeouts (158) while finishing with an ERA of 4.18 in 30 starts. He allowed the lowest line drive percentage of all major league pitchers (17.0%). Lucchesi struggled during the 2020 season, pitching to a 0-1 record and a 7.94 ERA with 5 strikeouts in 5.2 innings of work.

New York Mets
On January 19, 2021, Lucchesi was traded to the New York Mets as part of a three team trade that sent Joe Musgrove to the Padres and David Bednar, Omar Cruz, Drake Fellows, Hudson Head and Endy Rodríguez to the Pittsburgh Pirates. On June 21, Lucchesi was diagnosed with a “significant” tear in his left elbow’s ulnar collateral ligament. After being diagnosed with a complete tear of the ligament, it was announced that Lucchesi would undergo Tommy John surgery, ending his 2021 season. In 11 games on the year, he had recorded a 1-4 record and 4.46 ERA with 41 strikeouts in 38.1 innings pitched (however, over his final five starts of the 2021 season, Lucchesi recorded a 1.19 ERA in 22.2 innings).

Personal life
Lucchesi grew up a fan of the Oakland Athletics.

References

External links

1993 births
Living people
People from Newark, California
Baseball players from California
Major League Baseball pitchers
San Diego Padres players
New York Mets players
Chabot Gladiators baseball players
Southeast Missouri State Redhawks baseball players
Tri-City Dust Devils players
Fort Wayne TinCaps players
Lake Elsinore Storm players
San Antonio Missions players
El Paso Chihuahuas players